The Officials Committee for Domestic and External Security Coordination is a New Zealand government committee which gives the Prime Minister strategic policy advice on security and intelligence matters. Operational security matters are handled by other groups, including the Defence Force, the Ministry of Defence, the Security Intelligence Service, the Government Communications Security Bureau and Police.

The committee comprises the chief executives of the Ministry of Foreign Affairs and Trade, the Defence Force, the Ministry of Defence, the Security Intelligence Service, the Government Communications Security Bureau, Police, the Ministry of Civil Defence and Emergency Management, the Treasury and others. It is defined by the New Zealand Security Intelligence Service Act

The group is headed by the head of the Department of the Prime Minister and Cabinet, Andrew Kibblewhite.

Notable incidents
The group was involved in the anti-terror raids that occurred on 15 October 2007 and may be involved in some organised crime work.

It met on the day of the Christchurch mosque shootings on 15 March 2019 to coordinate the government's response.

References 

Government agencies of New Zealand
New Zealand intelligence agencies